Matthew R. Koch (born May 11, 1978) is an American politician serving as a member of the Kentucky House of Representatives from the 72nd district. Elected in November 2018, he assumed office on January 1, 2019.

Early life and education 
Koch was born in Paris, Kentucky. He attended the University of Kentucky College of Agriculture, Food, and Environment.

Career 
Koch served in the United States Marine Corps from 2000 to 2004 and retired with the rank of captain. He has co-owned Shawhan Place, a farm, since 2004. Koch was elected to the Kentucky House of Representatives in November 2018 and assumed office on January 1, 2019.

References 

1978 births
Living people
Republican Party members of the Kentucky House of Representatives
People from Paris, Kentucky
People from Bourbon County, Kentucky